The High Commissioner of Australia to Bangladesh is an officer of the Australian Department of Foreign Affairs and Trade and the head of the High Commission of the Commonwealth of Australia to the People's Republic of Bangladesh. The High Commission is located in Dhaka. The high commissioner has the rank and status of an Ambassador Extraordinary and Plenipotentiary and is held, since January 2020, by Jeremy Bruer, a career diplomat.

Posting history

The first official Australian presence in Bangladesh dates back to April 1969, when a Deputy High Commission (reporting to the High Commission of Australia in Islamabad, West Pakistan) was opened in the city of Dacca, the capital of East Pakistan. Career diplomat James Lawrence (Jim) Allen, was appointed as Deputy High Commissioner, operating from the Purbani Hotel in Motijheel Thana. Allen had previously served as the secretary to Richard Casey during his term as Governor of Bengal (1944–1946).

Australia was one of the first nations to officially recognise Bangladesh as an independent country on 31 January 1972, following the end of the Bangladesh Liberation War on 16 December 1971 and its status as East Pakistan. On 13 March 1972, the former Deputy High Commissioner in Dacca (renamed Dhaka in 1982) and Chargé d'affaires of the Australian mission since the establishment of diplomatic relations, Jim Allen, was appointed as Australia's first Ambassador to Bangladesh, which was quickly upgraded to the rank of high commissioner following Bangladesh's admission to the Commonwealth of Nations on 18 April 1972. Allen presented his letters of commission to the President of Bangladesh, Abu Sayeed Chowdhury, on 21 April 1972. Allen assisted in the first Australian official visit to Bangladesh, with the goodwill visit of the Australian foreign minister, Nigel Bowen, from 28 to 29 May 1972. On 26 January 1983, a new chancery for the High Commission was opened at 184 Gulshan Avenue, Gulshan, Dhaka.

Heads of mission

See also 

 Australia–Bangladesh relations
 Foreign relations of Bangladesh
 Foreign relations of Australia

References

External links

Australian High Commission, Bangladesh

Australia and the Commonwealth of Nations
Bangladesh and the Commonwealth of Nations
Bangladesh
 
Australia